Waterford is an unincorporated community in Coolspring Township, LaPorte County, Indiana, United States.

History
A post office was located in Waterford between 1850 and 1900. The community grew around a gristmill.

Notable people
John Rarick - U.S. Representative (1924-2009) from Louisiana was born in Waterford.

References

Unincorporated communities in LaPorte County, Indiana
Unincorporated communities in Indiana